Proheptazine is an opioid analgesic from the phenazepine family. It was invented in the 1960s.

Proheptazine produces similar effects to other opioids, including analgesia, sedation, euphoria, dizziness and nausea.

In the United States it is a Schedule I Narcotic controlled substance with an ACSCN of 9643 and a 2013 annual aggregate manufacturing quota of zero. The salts in use are the citrate (free base conversion ratio 0.589), hydrobromide (0.773), and hydrochloride (0.883).

References 

 

Opioids
Azepanes
Propionate esters
Mu-opioid receptor agonists